The Men's 85 kg weightlifting event was an event at the weightlifting competition, limiting competitors to a maximum of 85 kilograms of body mass. The whole competition took place on 8 October at 18:30. The event took  place at the Jawaharlal Nehru Stadium, Delhi.

The eventual winner from Australia represented Cameroon at the 2006 Commonwealth Games on won a bronze medal.

Results

References

See also 
2010 Commonwealth Games
Weightlifting at the 2010 Commonwealth Games

Weightlifting at the 2010 Commonwealth Games